Johann Fust was a German printer.

Fust may also refer to:

Fust baronets
Horst Fust (1930–2003), German newspaper journalist with Bild
John Fust (ice hockey) (born 1972), Canadian-Swiss ice hockey coach and player
Meta Fust Willoughby (1887-1937), American composer who used the pseudonym Meta Schumann
Milan Fust or Milán Füst (1888–1967), Hungarian writer, poet and playwright
Richard Fust (fl. 1421) of Warnham and Chichester, Sussex, English politician
Thomas Fust, burnt at the stake for his Protestant beliefs on 30 August 1555
Herbert Jenner-Fust (1778–1852), English judge and Dean of the Arches
Herbert Jenner-Fust (cricketer) (1841–1940), English cricketer

See also
Faust
Faustus (disambiguation)
Foust
Fuster